MUSD may refer to:

 Million United States dollars
 Marana Unified School District, a public school district in Marana, Arizona
 Martinez Unified School District, a public school district in Contra Costa County, California
 Middletown Unified School District, a public school district in Middletown, California
 Milpitas Unified School District, a public school district in Milpitas, California
 Morongo Unified School District, a public education governing body in the Mojave high desert, Southern California